George Ashby may refer to:

George Ashby (martyr) (died 1537), martyred English Cistercian monk
George Ashby (poet) (c. 1390–1475), English civil servant and poet
George Ashby (MP) (1656–1728), English politician
George Ashby (antiquary) (1724–1808), English antiquary